Luke Top (born May 29, 1980) is a singer-songwriter, multi-instrumentalist, record producer, and composer based in Los Angeles. He was the lead singer/bassist and one of the founding members of the afro-pop band Fool's Gold, who released 3 albums on the Iamsound label and performed both domestically and internationally, including appearances at the Glastonbury Festival, Hollywood Bowl, and Reading. In 2017 he joined as a touring member of the band Electric Guest. He also collaborates with Moby singer Mindy Jones in the ADLT VDEO project. His most recent solo album "Suspect Highs" was released by Org Music in 2016.

Early life and education 
Top was born Nativ Luke Top in Tel Aviv, Israel and immigrated to the USA when he was 3. He attended Cleveland High School in Reseda, CA. He received a B.A. in Musical and Recording Arts from San Francisco State University.

Career 
Top co-founded the band Fool's Gold with songwriting partner Lewis Pesacov in Los Angeles in 2008. They were signed to the Iamsound label and released 3 full length albums. They toured both domestically and internationally with bands such as Local Natives, Edward Sharpe and the Magnetic Zeros, and the Red Hot Chili Peppers. In 2009 Top released his first solo album "Friends" which was mixed by ex-Hippos member and Vampire Weekend collaborator Ariel Rechtshaid. In 2016 he released his "Suspect Highs" album on the Org Label. In 2017 he joined Electric Guest on bass, keys, and vocals in support of their second album "Plural."

Discography (selection)

Albums 
 Fool's Gold – Flying Lessons (performer, producer, writer)
 Fool's Gold – Fool's Gold (performer, writer)
 Fool's Gold – Leave No Trace (performer, writer)
 Foreign Born – Person To Person (performer)
 Cass McCombs – Dropping the Writ (performer, producer)
 Luke Top – Friends (performer, producer. writer)
 Luke Top – Suspect Highs (performer, producer, writer)
 Bart Davenport – Physical World (performer, producer, writer)

References

External links

1980 births
Living people
Musicians from Tel Aviv
San Francisco State University alumni
Israeli emigrants to the United States